Flex Your Rights (Flex) is a 501(c)(3) educational non-profit organization that aims to educate the public about how basic Bill of Rights protections apply during encounters with law enforcement. To accomplish this, Flex Your Rights creates and distributes media (including two full-length docudrama videos) that explains individuals' legal rights during a police encounter.

History
Flex was founded by Steven Silverman in 2002 and is based in Washington, D.C. Silverman, who serves as the organization's Executive Director, created Flex in response to what he perceived as widespread confusion over the basic rules of search and seizure. Silverman came to this conclusion while he worked as a campus organizer for the campaign to repeal the Higher Education Act’s aid-elimination penalty, which denies financial aid to students with drug convictions. As part of his work, Silverman prompted students to describe the details of the police stops and searches leading to their minor drug arrests.

Silverman noted a pattern during these interviews, and various legal and law enforcement experts confirmed his conclusion: The vast majority of people are mystified by the basic rules of search and seizure and due process of law. In order to ensure that constitutional rights and equal justice are upheld by law enforcement, Silverman believes we must build a constitutionally literate citizenry.

Videos

BUSTED: The Citizen's Guide to Surviving Police Encounters
In 2003, Flex secured funding from the Marijuana Policy Project grants program to create its first docudrama, BUSTED: The Citizen’s Guide to Surviving Police Encounters, hosted by Ira Glasser, past executive director of the American Civil Liberties Union. The film illustrates scenarios of police encountering citizens in various situations and how the relevant civil rights should be asserted in regards to the Fourth, Fifth and Sixth Amendments of the Constitution of the United States.

10 Rules for Dealing with Police
Flex has recently completed production of 10 Rules for Dealing with Police, a new docudrama that focuses on the concerns of communities of color.

Not Guilty: A Juror’s Guide to Protecting Good People from Bad Laws
The next film project is a film that illustrates the various US Constitutional rights and powers of juries, such as the option of jury nullification.

Controversies
In May 2010, two Norview High School teachers of Norfolk, Virginia were placed on paid administrative leave after screening Busted to their 12th grade Government class. A parent complained to the Norview administration that her daughter had come home from school and said, "You won't believe what we are learning in Government. They are teaching us how to hide our drugs." Norview's spokeswoman Elizabeth Thiel Mather said division leaders are currently investigating the incident over concerns that the materials were unauthorized.

Activism
Flex collaborates with community activists to fight new policing schemes that violate citizens' Bill of Rights protections. Successes include  victories against D.C. Mayor Adrian Fenty's Safe Homes Initiative and an attempt by the Washington Metropolitan Area Transit Authority to implement random searches of Metro passengers.

References

External links

BUSTED Official Video

Civil liberties advocacy groups in the United States
Non-profit organizations based in Washington, D.C.
Civil rights organizations in the United States